Slovene Americans or Slovenian Americans are Americans of full or partial Slovene or Slovenian ancestry. Slovenes mostly immigrated to America during the Slovene mass emigration period from the 1880s to World War I.

History 
The first Slovenes in the United States were Catholic missionary priests in the early 19th century. Two of the earliest such missionaries were Anton Kappus and Frederic Baraga. Many of these early immigrants were bilingual Slovene-German speakers.

The peak of emigration from what is now Slovenia was between 1860 and 1914; during this period, between 170,000 and 300,000 left areas that are now part of Slovenia. By 1880 there were around 1,000 Slovene Americans, many of whom worked in the Upper Midwest as miners; within 30 years, about 30,000 to 40,000 Slovenian immigrants lived in the area of Cleveland, Ohio, the center of Slovene American culture. The early waves of migrants were predominantly single men, many of whom (over 36% in the period 1899–1924) returned home after earning money in the United States, mostly in unskilled labor. Many stayed, however, and Slovene women followed in settling in the United States.

In 1914, Cleveland was the third most-populous Slovene city in the world, after Trieste and Ljubljana. Within Cleveland, Slovene Americans developed their own cultural and social institutions, including Slovene-owned groceries, bars, furniture stores, clothing shops, and other businesses; Catholic parishes and elementary schools; mutual aid and fraternal societies; and even a Slovene bank (established in St. Clair, Cleveland in 2010). By the 1930s, five out of 32 members of the Cleveland City Council were Slovene. Most Slovene Americans living in Cleveland eventually moved to the city's suburbs, although cultural institutions within the city limits remain significant. The Cleveland metropolitan area remains home to the largest population of Slovenians in the world outside of Slovenia.

Later Slovene arrivals migrated to the industrial cities or to mining towns in the Upper Midwest, Ohio and Pennsylvania. Two later periods of increased immigration to the United States were the years immediately after World War I (1919–1923) and World War II (1949–1956). Slovene post–World War II migrants consisted primarily of political refugees fleeing Josip Broz Tito's Communist regime in Yugoslavia; this group of migrants was generally older and better educated than earlier waves of Slovene migrants.

Among Slovene immigrants, some were devoutly Catholic, while others were secular and anticlerical, with some holding liberal or socialist views. The division between the two groups was a prominent feature of Slovene-American communal life for much of the 20th century. A minority of Slovene immigrants practiced the Lutheran faith. Most Lutheran Slovenes lived in the Prekmurje region, under Hungarian rather than Austrian rule; when members of this group immigrated to the United States, they maintained a distinct identity called Windish. The largest Windish settlement in the United States was in Bethlehem, Pennsylvania.

Demographics

Large concentrations 

 Cleveland, Ohio
 Pittsburgh, Pennsylvania
 Pueblo, Colorado
 Johnstown, Pennsylvania
 Chicago, Illinois
 Joliet, Illinois
 Indianapolis, Indiana
 Milwaukee, Wisconsin
 Eveleth, Minnesota

The Slovene population in the United States has been historically concentrated in the Great Lakes and Northeastern United States including Ohio, Pennsylvania, Illinois, Wisconsin, and Minnesota; as well as Colorado. According to the 2000 census, the five states with the largest Slovene populations were:
 Ohio – 59,683
 Pennsylvania – 19,006
 Illinois – 15,519
 Minnesota – 10,420
 California – 9,489

These five states are followed, in descending order, by Colorado, Michigan, Florida, New York, Texas, Indiana, Washington, Kansas, Maryland, West Virginia and Utah, again according to the 2000 census. The state with the smallest Slovene American population is North Dakota (107). There is no American state without Slovene descendants among its population.

Numbers
1910 census reported 183,431 persons of Slovene mother tongue living in the United States. By the time of the 1920 census, that figure had increased to 208,552. Following the enactment of restrictive immigration laws in the 1920s, the number of Slovenes immigrating to the United States declined. The 1990 census reported 124,437 Slovene-identifying people. Slovene-American sources give higher estimates of the total number of Americans of Slovene descent, of up to 300,000, or even (if persons with only one-quarter or one-eighth Slovene ancestry are counted) 500,000.

Fraternal, benevolent, social and cultural organizations
In the late 19th century and early 20th century, Slovene Americans established a variety of social groups, including fraternal organizations, mutual insurance, and self-help societies, and cultural and educational institutions, such as choral and drama societies, gymnastics groups, and Slovene-language newspapers. The establishment of Slovene American insurance companies allowed immigrants to protect themselves against discrimination and fraud. A number of mergers and name changes took place during the 20th century, Some Slovene American fraternal, benevolent, social, and cultural organizations include:
 Jugoslovenska katoliška jednota (South Slavic Catholic Union), founded in Ely, MN in 1898, became American Fraternal Union (AFU) in 1941.
 Kranjsko-slovenska katoliška jednota, (Carnolan Slovene Catholic Union) founded in Joliet in 1894, became the Ameriško-slovenska katoliška jednota or American Slovenian Catholic Union (KSKJ).
 Slovenska narodna podporna jednota, founded in Chicago in 1904, became Slovene National Benefit Society (SNPJ).
 Zahodna slovanska veza, founded in 1908, became Western Slavonic Association (WSA).
 Indianapolis Slovenian National Home, founded in 1918.
 Slovenska dobrodelna zveza (Slovenian Mutual Benefit Association), founded in Cleveland in 1910; became American Mutual Life Association (AMLA) in 1966.

 Slovenski Narodni Dom (Slovenian National Home), Cleveland; founded in 1914.
 Progresivne Slovenke Amerike (Progressive Slovene Women of America) (PSWA), founded in 1934.
 Slovenska ženska zveza Amerike, founded in Chicago in 1926, became Slovenian Women's Union of America (SWUA), and now Slovenian Union of America (SUA).
 Slovenian Catholic Center, also known as Slovenian Cultural Center, Lemont, IL
 Slovenian Cultural Society Triglav, Norway, WI; founded in 1952.
 National Cleveland-style Polka Hall of Fame and Museum, Cleveland
 American Slovenian Club of Fairport Harbor, Fairport Harbor, OH
 Slovene Home for the Aged, Cleveland
 Slovenian Museum and Archives, Cleveland
 Slovenska Pristava, Harpersfield, OH; Slovenian Catholic recreation and retreat center
 Slovenian National Home, Chisholm, MN (closed)

For a longer discussion of the history of Slovene fraternalism in the United States, see the following article: Fraternal Benefit Societies and Slovene Immigrants in the USA.

The Slovenian Genealogy Society, International helps members trace their Slovene roots.

Slovene churches and choirs in the United States
A total of 39 Slovene parishes were established in the United States. The first Slovene national parish with a Slovene priest was formed in 1891 in Chicago. Four Slovene parishes were subsequently established on the east side of Cleveland: St. Vitus's (Sveti Vit) (established 1893); St. Lawrence (established 1901); St. Mary of the Assumption (1905), and St. Christine's (1925). St. Vitus's eventually grew to encompass a school and convent; a large new church in the Lombard Romanesque style, was built in 1932.

St. Cyril Roman Catholic Church in the East Village, Manhattan, was established in 1916 as a Slovene parish.

Holy Family Roman Catholic Church was established in 1908 in Kansas City, Kansas by immigrants from Lower Carniola.

The Slovenian Chapel of Our Lady of Brezje, in the Basilica of the National Shrine of the Immaculate Conception, Washington, D.C., is the dedicated Slovenian National Marian Shrine, founded in 1971.

Multiple Slovene choruses have been formed, including The Singing Slovenes in Duluth, Minnesota (founded in 1980), the Ely Slovenian Chorus in Ely, Minnesota (founded in 1969 by Mary Hutar, final performance in 2009); the Fantye na vasi (Boys from the Village) men's a cappella choir in Cleveland (founded in 1977); and the Zarja Singing Society, Cleveland (founded in 1916).

Slovene schools in the United States
 St. Vitus Child Slovenian Language School, Cleveland
 St. Mary Slovenian Language School, Cleveland
 Slomškova slovenska šola / Slomšek Slovenian School, Lemont, IL
 St. Stephen School, St. Stephen, Minnesota, was a public school, but from the late 1880 to the 1950s was predominately Slovenian and only spoke Slovenian until the early 1920s.

Media 
The first newspaper established by Slovene Americans was Ameriški Slovenec (American Slovene), which was published in Chicago beginning in 1891 and subsequently in Cleveland. It originally had three versions: a Slovene-language edition, a standard English edition, and an English edition with Slovene phonetic spelling. The newspaper continues today as a weekly.

Between 1891 and the 1990s, more than a hundred other Slovene-language newspapers and publications were established in the United States; only a handful were in print for more than a few years. The University of Minnesota Libraries has catalogued some 45 Slovene-language newspapers published in the United States in a variety of locations, including Colorado, Milwaukee, Cleveland, Detroit, Pittsburgh, and New York.

Notable people

See also 

 Slovene Canadians
 Slovene Australians
 Slovene Argentines
 Slovenia–United States relations

References

Further reading
 Arnez, John A. Slovenian community in Bridgeport, Conn (New York: Studia Slovenica, 1971).
 Gobetz, Edward. "Slovenian Americans." Gale Encyclopedia of Multicultural America, edited by Thomas Riggs, (3rd ed., vol. 4, Gale, 2014), pp. 223–239. Online
 Gobetz, Edward, and Adele Donchenko, eds. Anthology of Slovenian American Literature (Willoughby Hills, Ohio: Slovenian Research Center of America, 1977).
 Prisland, Marie. From Slovenia to America: Recollections and Collections (Milwaukee: Bruce, 1968).

External links
 SNPJ Slovenian Heritage Center, Museum in Pennsylvania

 
European-American society
 
American